Elections to Belfast Corporation were held on 18 May 1955, alongside elections to Northern Ireland's other municipal councils. The Ulster Unionists maintained their dominance of the 60-seat corporation, gaining 3 seats to bring their total number of seats to 50.

Council results

Ward results

Clifton Ward

Alderman

Councillors

Court Ward

Councillors

Cromac Ward

Councillors

Dock Ward

Alderman

Councillors

Duncairn Ward

Alderman

Councillors

Falls Ward

Alderman

Councillors

Ormeau Ward

Councillors

Pottinger Ward

Councillors

Shankill Ward

Alderman

Councillors

Smithfield Ward

Alderman

Councillors

St Anne's Ward

Alderman

Councillors

St George's Ward

Councillors

Victoria Ward

Alderman

Councillors

Windsor

Alderman

Councillors

Woodvale Ward

Alderman

Councillors

References

Belfast City Council elections
1955 Northern Ireland local elections
20th century in Belfast